David Knox may refer to:

David Knox (photographer) (1821–1895), Scottish-American photographer of the American Civil War
David Broughton Knox (1916–1994), Australian Anglican priest, Principal of Moore Theological College, 1959–1985
Sir David Knox (politician) (born 1933), English Conservative Member of Parliament
David Knox (rugby union) (born 1963), Australian rugby union player and coach
David Knox (businessman) (fl. 2003–), Scottish/Australian businessman and director of oil and gas company Santos
David Knox (rugby league) (fl. 1964–1971), Australian rugby league player
David Knox (fl. 2007–), creator of Australian-based website TV Tonight